Blue Downs is a town in the Western Cape, South Africa. It forms part of the Oostenberg subregion of the City of Cape Town situated on the eastern outskirts of the city and is also located on the Cape Flats, a flat expanse of land east of Cape Town.

The suburb is one of the outlying areas of Cape Town that has been targeted by the Western Cape provincial government for development. Planned developments include improved public transportation for the area and the building of additional schools.

See also
Blackheath train accident

References

Suburbs of Cape Town
Former Coloured townships in South Africa
Townships in the Western Cape